Battle of Britain Memorial may refer to:

 Battle of Britain Memorial, Capel-le-Ferne, Kent
 Battle of Britain Memorial, London
 Battle of Britain Memorial Flight, an RAF display team.